Arthur Allyn Jr. (December 24, 1913 – March 22, 1985) was the co-owner of the Chicago White Sox of the American League with his brother John Allyn from  through . A few years after purchasing the franchise from Bill Veeck, Allyn tried to sell the team to a number of different parties, including Lamar Hunt and Bud Selig (who planned to move the team to Milwaukee, Wisconsin), before selling his share of the White Sox to his co-owner and brother John. Allyn also owned the Chicago Mustangs soccer club that was a charter member of the United Soccer Association in 1967. The Mustangs became part of the newly formed North American Soccer League the following year after merging with the NPSL.

Personal life 
Arthur Allyn graduated from Dartmouth College in 1935 and was a member of the Sigma Chi Fraternity. He received the "Significant Sig" award from the fraternity in 1969.

References
White Sox History on Baseball Library

1913 births
1985 deaths
Major League Baseball owners
Chicago White Sox owners
Sportspeople from Chicago
North American Soccer League (1968–1984) executives